John Augustine Marshall (September 5, 1854 – April 4, 1941) was a United States district judge of the United States District Court for the District of Utah.

Education and career

Born on September 5, 1854, near Warrenton, Virginia, Marshall received a Bachelor of Laws in 1874 from the University of Virginia School of Law. He entered private practice in Warrenton from 1874 to 1878. He continued private practice in Salt Lake City, Utah Territory (State of Utah from January 4, 1896) from 1878 to 1896. He was a Judge of the Salt Lake County Territorial Probate Court from 1888 to 1889. He was a territorial representative for Salt Lake County in 1892.

Federal judicial service

Marshall was nominated by President Grover Cleveland on January 13, 1896, to the United States District Court for the District of Utah, to a new seat authorized by 28 Stat. 107. He was confirmed by the United States Senate on February 4, 1896, and received his commission the same day. His service terminated on September 8, 1915, due to his resignation.

Later career and death

Following his resignation from the federal bench, Marshall resumed private practice in Salt Lake City from 1915 to 1924. He died on April 4, 1941, in Salt Lake City.

References

Sources
 

1854 births
1941 deaths
University of Virginia School of Law alumni
Judges of the United States District Court for the District of Utah
United States federal judges appointed by Grover Cleveland
19th-century American judges
People from Salt Lake City